This is a list of the Wardens of New College, Oxford. The Warden is the college's principal, responsible for its academic leadership, chairing its governing body, and representing it in the outside world.

1379–1389: Nicholas Wykeham
1389–1396: Thomas Cranley
1396–1403: Richard Malford
1403–1429: John Bowke or Bouke
1429–1435: William Estcourt
1435–1454: Nicholas Ossulbury
1454–1475: Thomas Chaundler
1475–1494: Walter Hyll
1494–1520: William Porter
1520–1521: John Rede
1521–1526: John Young
1526–1542: John London
1542–1551: Henry Cole
In 1547, Thomas Harding was named Warden by King Edward VI
1551–1553: Ralph Skinner
1553–1573: Thomas Whyte, or White
In 1556, John Harpsfield was elected Warden but did not assume the office.
1573–1599: Martin Culpepper
1599–1613: George Ryves
1613–1617: Arthur Lake
1617–1647: Robert Pinck
1647–1648: Henry Stringer
1649–1658: George Marshall (intruded by the Parliamentary Commissioners)
1658–1675: Michael Woodward
1675–1679: John Nicholas
1679–1701: Henry Beeston
1701–1703: Richard Traffles
1703–1712: Thomas Brathwait
1712–1720: John Cobb
1720–1724: John Dobson
1725–1730: Henry Bigg
1730–1740: John Coxed
1740–1764: John Purnell
1764–1768: Thomas Hayward
1768–1794: John Oglander
1794–1822: Samuel Gauntlett
1822–1840: Philip Nicholas Shuttleworth
1840–1860: Rev. David Williams
1860–1903: James Edwards Sewell
1903–1924: William Archibald Spooner
1925–1940: Herbert Fisher
1944–1958: Alic Halford Smith
1958–1976: Sir William Hayter 
1976–1985: Arthur Hafford Cooke
1985–1996: Harvey McGregor QC
1996–2009: Alan Ryan
2009–2016: Sir Curtis Price
2016–present: Miles Young

Notes

New College, Wardens
New College, Oxford